Biache-Saint-Vaast station (French: Gare de Biache-Saint-Vaast) is a railway station serving the commune of Biache-Saint-Vaast, Pas-de-Calais department of France. It is located at kilometric point (KP) 204.333 on the Paris-Lille railway.

The station is owned and operated by the SNCF and served by TER Hauts-de-France trains.

History 

In 2019, the SNCF estimated that 61,097 passengers traveled through the station.

Services 
As of 2021, the station is served by TER Hauts-de-France trains between Arras and Douai.

References 

Railway stations in Pas-de-Calais